Tainai Dam  are two dams in the Niigata Prefecture, Japan. They are called Tainai I Dam and Tainai II Dam.

References

Dams in Niigata Prefecture